This is a list of transactions that have taken place during the 2021 NBL off-season and the 2021–22 NBL season.

Retirements

Front office movements

Coaching changes

Player movements

Retained players/Contract extensions

Released players

Free agency

Next Star program 
The Next Star Program is designed to provide young elite overseas players, mainly Americans, with a professional option immediately out of secondary school. Each team receives one additional import roster slot intended to provide a "Next Star" slot. Contracts are two-year contracts with the NBL which allows players to move between clubs between seasons.

Signings

Transfers

Departing the league

Rosters

Adelaide 36ers

Brisbane Bullets

Cairns Taipans

Illawarra Hawks

Melbourne United

New Zealand Breakers

Perth Wildcats

South East Melbourne Phoenix

Sydney Kings

Tasmania JackJumpers

See also 

 2021–22 NBL season
 National Basketball League (Australia)

References 

2021–22 NBL season
2021